The following is a list of Arena Football League (AFL) arenas. American and Canadian football is traditionally played outdoors on grass or artificial turf fields 120–150 yards (109.73–137.16 m) in length. However, arena football is played in covered climate-controlled multi-purpose venues. The field is comparable to the size of a National Hockey League rink, allowing  for a scrimmage area. The AFL was established in 1987 and featured arena football teams across the United States until it folded in 2019. In 2014, the average AFL attendance was 8,473 per game. That year the Tampa Bay Storm averaged the most attendees per game with 11,402. The Orlando Predators were the least attended team in 2014 drawing an average of 5,421 per game. Talking Stick Resort Arena was the home of the Arizona Rattlers from 1992 until the team's departure in 2016, making it the longest operating AFL venue. The smallest venue to house an AFL team was the 5,000 seat West Palm Beach Auditorium, the home of the Florida Bobcats from 1996 to 1998. ArenaBowl IX at the Thunderdome (now Tropicana Field) in St. Petersburg, Florida on September 1, 1995, was the highest attended game in AFL history (25,087). Joe Louis Arena in Detroit has been host to four ArenaBowls (1989, 1990, 1991, 1993).

Defunct teams

References

Arenas